The milk-cream strudel is a traditional Viennese strudel and a popular pastry over Austria and many countries in Europe that once belonged to the Austro-Hungarian Empire (1867–1918). It is an oven-baked pastry dough stuffed with a filling made from diced, milk-soaked bread rolls, egg yolk, powdered sugar, butter, quark, vanilla, lemon zest, raisins and cream and is served in the pan with hot vanilla sauce.

History
The first documented strudel recipe was a recipe of a milk-cream strudel from 1696 in Vienna, a handwritten recipe at the Viennese City Library.

Recipe
Besides the strudel dough the ingredients are: cream, egg yolks, blanched, ground almonds, sugar, 1 roll soaked in milk, 2 whites snow (stiffly beaten egg whites). Sprinkle with raisins and bake lightly. Then pour over sugared milk. Let it evaporate. Then bake in casserole. Serve in the pan with hot vanilla sauce.

See also

 Apple strudel
 List of pastries
 List of stuffed dishes

References

Austrian pastries
Croatian cuisine
Czech cuisine
Hungarian desserts
Stuffed desserts